The Ducati Museum is a transport museum in Bologna, Italy at the Ducati factory.  It contains a collection of Ducati motorcycles and some early non-automotive products.  It opened in 1998.

The museum's collection of technical documentation was selected by Italian Ministry of Cultural Heritage and Activities for inclusion in the national archive.

Notes

References

External links

Ducati Museum photo tour at ducati.com

Ducati (company)
Motorcycle museums in Italy
Museums established in 1998
Tourist attractions in Bologna
Museums in Bologna